Tommaso Polo (born 16 February 1998) is an Italian professional footballer who plays as a right-back.

Club career

ChievoVerona

Loan to Prato 
On 14 July 2017, Polo was signed by Serie C side Prato on a season-long loan deal. Polo ended his season-long loan with only 9 appearances, all as a starter, all in the first part off the season, and Prato was also relegated in Serie D.

Career statistics

Club

References

External links
 
 

1998 births
Footballers from Verona
Living people
Italian footballers
A.C. Prato players
A.S.D. Villafranca players
A.S.D. Città di Varese players
Serie C players
Serie D players
Association football fullbacks